Bergdahl may refer to:

People
 Bowe Bergdahl (born 1986), United States Army soldier, who was held captive from June 2009 to May 2014 by the Taliban
 Johan Bergdahl (born 1962), Swedish fencer
 Leif Bergdahl (born 1941), Swedish physician and politician
 Michael Bergdahl, author and professional business speaker

Places
 Bergdahl Lake, lake in Watonwan County, Minnesota, United States